A principle is a value that is a guide for behavior.

Principle may also refer to:

Principle (chemistry), a constituent of a substance
Principle (linguistics), a grammar rule that is invariable across languages
Principle Pictures, US
 The Principle, term for polygamy used by certain Mormon fundamentalist practitioners; see Mormonism and polygamy
The Principle, 2014 film by Robert Sungenis
Principle or value in ethics
Principle in principles and parameters
Principles (retailer), a UK-based fashion retailer
Principles (book), 2017, by Ray Dalio
Jamie Principle, American musician

See also

Principal (disambiguation), easily confused word